The 1982 United States House of Representatives elections in Virginia were held on November 2, 1982 to determine who will represent the Commonwealth of Virginia in the United States House of Representatives. Virginia had ten seats in the House, apportioned according to the 1980 United States Census. Representatives are elected for two-year terms.

Overview

References

See also
 United States House elections, 1982

Virginia
1982
1982 Virginia elections